The Wunsch Building of New York University Tandon School of Engineering is the present name of the former Bridge Street Methodist Church, a former Methodist church located at 311 Bridge Street, on the east side between Johnson Street and Myrtle Avenue, in Downtown Brooklyn, New York City. The Greek Revival temple was erected 1844. It is also recorded as the First Congregational Church.

The building dates to 1847 and was the first independent black church in Brooklyn.  It was also a stop on the Underground Railroad and has been designated a historic landmark since November 24, 1981.

The former church was recorded in the AIA Guide to New York City (1977) as the NYU Tandon School of Engineering annex. "A Greek Revival temple in brick with wood columns and entablature: chaste, excepting the later Victorian stained glass, which is exuberant even from the outside."

The church building is now called the Wunsch Building and houses the school's Undergraduate Admissions offices. It is used to host many social, cultural, and academic events for the school and community.

See also  
 List of New York City Landmarks

References 

Churches completed in 1847
19th-century Methodist church buildings in the United States
Methodist churches in New York City
Congregational churches in New York City
Churches in Brooklyn
New York City Designated Landmarks in Brooklyn
Closed churches in New York City
Churches on the Underground Railroad
Former churches in New York (state)
Greek Revival architecture in New York City
Greek Revival church buildings in New York City
1847 establishments in New York (state)
New York University
Downtown Brooklyn